The Arlington is a  tall mixed-use high-rise in Charlotte, North Carolina. The building was the first residential high-rise and first mixed use high-rise development in the city. The developer, Jim Gross, is also noted for the first downtown residential development (Ivey's) and the first loft-style development in the city (Factory South) among many other developments. It was completed in 2003 and has 24 floors and an outdoor swimming pool on the roof. It is the 16th tallest building in Charlotte, and is the tallest building outside of downtown. It was originally planned to be  and 42 stories tall when announced in September 1997, but it was scaled back because the developer was unable to secure the financing required to build a 425-foot (130 m) building.

Because the building is located outside the I-277 inner-loop, the apartments on the city-side of the building have a fantastic view of the Charlotte skyline.

A residential tower with some office and commercial space, The Arlington is well known because of its pink glass. Local nicknames include "Big Pink", "The Pink Building", and "Pepto-Bismol." The actual color of the glass  is "Desert Rose" or "6F2828". The color does not tint views from the inside. 

The building is notable for being the location of Nikko's, a large modern sushi restaurant which is one of Charlotte's hottest night spots.

See also
 List of tallest buildings in Charlotte

References

Emporis

Office buildings in Charlotte, North Carolina
Office buildings completed in 2002
Residential buildings completed in 2002
2002 establishments in North Carolina
Residential buildings in North Carolina